KNLH (89.5 FM) is a radio station licensed to Cedar Hill, Missouri, United States.  The station broadcasts a Religious format as an affiliate of Here's Help Network, and is owned by New Life Evangelistic Center.

References

External links
KNLH's official website

NLH